Stadion FK Budućnost is a multi-use stadium in Banovići, Bosnia and Herzegovina.  It is currently used mostly for football matches and is the home ground of FK Budućnost Banovići. The capacity of the stadium is 8,500 seats.

External links
Stadion FK Budućnost Banovići at online-betting-academy.com

FK Budućnost Banovići
b